King Estate Winery is an organic winery located southwest of Eugene, Oregon, United States near the community of Lorane. Matt Kramer of The Oregonian considers King Estate the benchmark producer of Pinot gris (aka Pinot grigio) in the country.  While the winery also makes Pinot noir and limited amounts of Chardonnay, it is mainly credited with bringing the Pinot gris grape varietal into national consciousness.

The winery was founded  by Ed King Jr. and his son, Ed King III. The visitor center has a restaurant and wine bar. Complimentary wine tasting and winery tours are available as well as full lunch and dinner menus.

In the 2007 edition of Wine & Spirits magazine's annual restaurant poll, a survey of only the top Zagat rated restaurants across the United States, King Estate Pinot gris was the number one ranked domestic wine in the Pinot gris/Pinot grigio category, and number two overall in the category, the highest rank for an Oregon producer in the 18-year history of the poll.

Sustainability

King Estate Winery is Certified Organic by Oregon Tilth. In 2005, King Estate was recognized by Oregon Tilth as the Organic producer of the year.

Culinary
During the 1990s, King Estate published two cookbooks: King Estate's New American Cuisine King Estate Pinot Gris Cookbook and New American Cuisine King Estate Pinot Noir Cookbook were written in conjunction with the 13-part New American Cuisine television series broadcast by PBS and other public television stations nationwide. In 1997, New American Cuisine was nominated for the prestigious James Beard Award for best national cooking series. The cookbooks contain recipes contributed by chefs including Alice Waters, Roy Yamaguchi, Charlie Trotter, and Jean-Georges Vongerichten.

See also
Oregon wine

References

External links

King Estate, Oregon's biggest winery, gives smallest tour - The Oregonian

 

Wineries in Oregon
Lane County, Oregon
American companies established in 1991
1991 establishments in Oregon